{{DISPLAYTITLE:C9H20O}}
The molecular formula C9H20O (molar mass: 144.25 g/mol, exact mass: 144.1514 u) may refer to:

 3-Methyl-3-octanol, or 3-methyloctan-3-ol
 1-Nonanol
 2-Nonanol